Ayhan Güçlü (born 28 March 1990) is a Turkish former professional footballer who played as a forward.

Personal life
Güçlü's younger brother, Metehan Güçlü, is also a professional footballer and youth international for Turkey.

References

External links
 

1990 births
Living people
People from Montfermeil
Footballers from Seine-Saint-Denis
Association football forwards
Turkish footballers
Turkey youth international footballers
French footballers
French people of Turkish descent
Challenger Pro League players
Liga I players
Hacettepe S.K. footballers
Thonon Evian Grand Genève F.C. players
A.F.C. Tubize players
FC Brașov (1936) players
Olympique Saint-Quentin players
Turkish expatriate footballers
Expatriate footballers in Belgium
Turkish expatriate sportspeople in Belgium
Expatriate footballers in Romania
Turkish expatriate sportspeople in Romania